Zamboanga City's 1st congressional district is one of the two congressional districts of the Philippines in Zamboanga City. It has been represented in the House of Representatives since 2007. It was created by the 2004 reapportionment that divided the city into two congressional districts and which took effect in 2007. The district is composed of 38 barangays in the city's west coast and includes most of its downtown commercial core. It is currently represented in the 19th Congress by Khymer Adan Olaso of the Adelante Zamboanga Party.

Representation history

Election results

2022

2019

2016

2013

2010

See also
Legislative districts of Zamboanga City

References

Congressional districts of the Philippines
Politics of Zamboanga City
2004 establishments in the Philippines
Congressional districts of Zamboanga Peninsula
Constituencies established in 2004